AREP ("Management, Research, Interchange") is a multidisciplinary consultancy that is wholly owned by SNCF (Stations and Connections division). It was formed in 1997 by Jean-Marie Duthilleul and Étienne Tricaud, architects and engineers. It has 600 staff from around 15 countries, including town planners, architects, engineers, economists, technicians, designers, and project managers.

History 

The main area of work for the company is mobility in the urban environment, both in France and worldwide.

Organisation 
AREP is organised into four subsidiaries: AREP (Project management in France), PARVIS (Project support), AREP Ville (Architectural and town planning studies) and  MENIGHETTI Programmation (urban and architectural project management, and service plans).

Projects
Redevelopment of the Gare de Strasbourg
Redevelopment of the Gare de Paris-Nord
Redevelopment of the Gare d'Angers Saint-Laud
Redevelopment of the Gare de Bellegarde-sur-Valserine
Redevelopment of the Gare du Mans
Design and build of the Gare de Nîmes-Pont-du-Gard
Layout of the Avenue Jean-Jaurès, Paris
Design and build of the Shanghai South railway station,
Design and build of the Aspire Tower in Doha, Qatar, opened in 2007
Design and build of the Bitexco Financial Tower in Ho Chi Minh City, Vietnam, opened in 2010
Design and build of Wuhan railway station, China
Design and build of the Gare de Belfort - Montbéliard TGV
Design and build of the Gare de Besançon Franche-Comté TGV

2003
 Gare de Paris-Nord, France: Redevelopment of the Eurostar terminal and shopping areas, station management, at 
 Perpignan, Pyrénées Orientales, France: project support and development and management of the station district
 Avignon Courtine: architectural plan for the Avignon PLU, in association with the architects Alain Philip et Safia Amarouche, and Michel Desvigne et Ingénieurs and landscapers Jean-Claude Hardy
 Vaucluse: development plan
 Rovaltain: Zone d'aménagement concerté (ZAC) Phase II, in association with landscapers Michel Florain
 Drôme: Prime contractor
 Bondy-Aulnay tram-train: rural and urban feasibility study for 11 crossroads, the Viaduc du Gargan, design of a new OHE system, with Béatrice Fauny landscapers
 Seine-Saint-Denis, France: development plan
 Port of Yong Ding Men, China: development plan. Lauréat dans le cadre du concours de requalification et d’aménagement de l’axe historique Nord-Sud.

2001
 Aix-en-Provence: new TGV station and site development, with Michel Desvigne et Christine Dalnoky landscapers. 
 Gare d'Angers-Saint-Laud: redevelopment, development plan, station management.
 Gare d'Antibes: station management
 Avignon: new TGV station and site development, with Michel Desvigne et Christine Dalnoky landscapers
 Gare de Lyon-Part-Dieu: Redevelopment, station management
 Gare de Marseille-Saint-Charles: Security and surveillance post
 Gare de Nogent - Le Perreux: redevelopment

2000
 Gare de Limoges-Bénédictins: redevelopment of the station and the left dome after a fire. Station management.
 Gare de Lourdes: redevelopment, station management
 Gare du Futuroscope, Poitiers: new station, in association with Denis Laming architects

1999
 Haussmann – Saint-Lazare (Paris RER): new station for RER E
 Magenta (Paris RER): new station for RER E
 Bibliothèque François Mitterrand (Paris Métro and RER): new interchange with the Météor metro line and RER C
 Gare de Monaco-Monte-Carlo: station reconstruction, station management

1998
 Issy – Val de Seine (Paris RER): station renovation and creation of tram interchange, station management 
 Gare de Paris-Nord: renovation and extensions for the Eurostar terminal, station management
 Stade de France – Saint-Denis (Paris RER): new station for RER D
 La Plaine – Stade de France (Paris RER): new station for RER B

1997
 Creating the Tecno range of seating
 Gare de Nantes: station management,
 Journées Mondiales de la Jeunesse (JMJ) 1997, Podiums at Longchamp and Champs de Mars, station management, Paris, France
 Gare de Versailles – Chantiers, Yvelines: project management

Before 1997
 Gare de Lille-Europe: new TGV station and station management, development of the station district
 Gare de Paris-Montparnasse: station renovation and management
 Gare de Paris-Nord: station reconstruction, station management
 Gare de Marne-la-Vallée - Chessy, Seine et Marne: new station serving Disneyland Paris 
 Gare Aéroport Charles-de-Gaulle 2 TGV, Ile-de-France: new station

References

External links
 

Construction and civil engineering companies of France
SNCF companies and subsidiaries
Companies based in Paris
Construction and civil engineering companies established in 1997
French companies established in 1997